"Dialogue" is a song written by Robert Lamm for the group Chicago and recorded for their album Chicago V (1972). On the album the song is over 7 minutes long and is divided in two parts. An edited version was released as a single in October 1972, eventually reaching #24 on the U.S. Billboard Hot 100.

In Part I, the song's lyrics are a dialogue between two young people with different views. The first person (whose lines are sung by Terry Kath) is very concerned about events of the early 1970s, such as the Vietnam war, starvation, and "repression... closing in around."  The second person (whose lines are sung by Peter Cetera) maintains that "everything is fine." The dialogue between the two people is also reflected musically, with Kath's guitar and Cetera's bass feeding off each other. As Part I comes to a close, Kath's character thanks the other character for the talk, saying "you know you really eased my mind/I was troubled by the shapes of things to come." Cetera's character response is of gratitude for the eye-opener: "Well, if you had my outlook, your feelings would be numb – you'd always think that everything was fine".

With the two characters acknowledging the other's position, the song moves to Part II, where more propositive lyrics such as "we can make it better", "we can change the world now" and "we can save the children" are sung by the whole band. In the finale, the music fades away with the band singing a cappella the optimistic appeal "we can make it happen".

A live recording of the full song can be heard in Chicago XXXIV: Live in '75. Part II was included in Greatest Hits, Volume II (1982).

Personnel
 Terry Kath – guitar, lead vocals (1st person, part 1), backing vocals (part 2)
 Peter Cetera – bass, lead vocals (2nd person, part 1), backing vocals (part 2)
 Robert Lamm – keyboards, backing vocals (part 2)
 Danny Seraphine – drums, backing vocals (part 2)
 Jimmy Pankow – trombone, backing vocals (part 2)
 Lee Loughnane – trumpet, backing vocals (part 2)
 Walt Parazaider – tenor saxophone, backing vocals (part 2)

Chart history

References

1972 singles
Chicago (band) songs
Songs written by Robert Lamm
Song recordings produced by James William Guercio
Columbia Records singles
1971 songs